RSS Racing (also known as Ryan Shane Sieg Racing) is an American professional stock car racing team that currently competes in the NASCAR Xfinity Series and the ARCA Menards Series. The team is owned by Rod Sieg and Pamela Sieg. The main sponsor on for this team is CMR Construction and Roofing. The team currently fields the
No. 28 Ford Mustang full-time for Kyle Sieg, the No. 39 full-time for Ryan Sieg, and the No. 38 full-time for Joe Graf Jr. and other drivers.

Equipment
The team purchased rolling chassis from Kevin Harvick Incorporated until KHI's shutdown. The team formerly used Earnhardt Childress Racing engines; RSS Racing used engines from Pro Motor Engines from 2013 to 2018. In 2019 the team signed a new deal with ECR Engines, and also purchased chassis from Richard Childress Racing over the offseason.
The team will switch to run Ford Mustangs in 2021 powered by Roush-Yates engines.

Xfinity Series

Car No. 23 history
Starting in 2021, RSS fielded the No. 23 entry in collaboration with Reaume Brothers Racing. Jason White drove this car at Daytona, Natalie Decker drove at Daytona RC, lastly Tyler Reddick drove it at Homestead with Our Motorsports taking over the No. 23 entry after that.

Car No. 23 results

Car No. 28 history
In 2022, Kyle Sieg would drive the No. 28 RSS Racing Ford part time, the same number he drove in the ARCA series last year. C. J. McLaughlin would drive the 28 at Las Vegas. Patrick Gallagher would drive at COTA and finish 22nd. Natalie Decker would drive at Martinsville. McLaughlin would drive at Talladega but fail to qualify. Kyle will drive the No. 28 full-time in 2023.

Car No. 28 results

Car No. 37 history
J. J. Yeley drove the No. 37 car in the 2018 Kansas Lottery 300 at Kansas Speedway, start-and-parking the car. Jeff Green drove the No. 37 car at the Ford EcoBoost 300 at Homestead, also start-and-parking the car.

Car No. 37 results

Car No. 38 history

Gray Gaulding drove a No. 38 entry during the 2017 Drive Sober 200 at Dover, starting-and-parking the car. Jeff Green would then drive the car at Charlotte and Kansas. The team became full-time in 2018. Green would drive the season opener without start and parking only in Superspeedways include Daytona and Talladega. Green finished an outstanding 11th place, the best finish with the number 38 car. Green Start-and-Parked the next two races at Atlanta and Las Vegas. J. J. Yeley then took over the car, finishing 21st at ISM Raceway, and 34th at Auto Club Speedway. Yeley and Green continued to be the team’s primary drivers, and they start and parked about half of the time. Ryan Sieg made 2 starts in the car, with Brian Henderson & Angela Ruch making one apiece. Yeley’s best finish was an 11th at Talladega and Las Vegas, and Green’s best finish was once again an 11th, this time at the season opener. Sieg finished 15th at Bristol Motor Speedway and 22nd at Homestead-Miami Speedway. Henderson finished 18th at Road America and Ruch finished 29th at Kansas Speedway. In 2019 Yeley and Green continued to be the team’s primary drivers, with C. J. McLaughlin, Bayley Currey and Josh Bilicki coming on board for a limited schedule. This time the team started-and-parked at all tracks other than Daytona International Speedway. For the season opener at Daytona, Josh Bilicki was the driver, and he finished 23rd. At the Daytona night race, Jeff Green drove the car to a 7th-place finish. In 2020 the #38 showed up for the season opener with Jeff Green, but was replaced with Ross Chastain after Chastain failed to qualify in his #10 Kaulig Racing ride. He finished 22nd 6 laps down. The 38 didn’t return until the fall Talladega race, where Jeff Green finished 29th. The #38 car returned to the 2021 Championship race at Phoenix with RSS regular Ryan Sieg behind the wheel, while his younger brother Kyle Sieg would drive the 39. 

In 2022, C. J. McLaughlin, Joe Graf Jr., Kyle Sieg, Parker Retzlaff, Loris Hezemans, Will Rodgers, Ryan Sieg, Darren Dilley, Patrick Gallagher and yet to be considered drivers would split the seat time in the #38 RSS Racing Ford. Timmy Hill was due to run in the Production Alliance Group 300, but was replaced by Graf. In the United Rentals 200 an 18-year old Retzlaff made his debut and qualified in sixth place before retiring from the race with a fuel pump problem on lap 158. In the Pacific Office Automation 147, road course ringer Darren Dilley made his debut.

In 2023, Graf is set to drive 28 races in the No. 38.

Car No. 38 results

Car No. 39 history

The No. 39 car was the first entry for RSS Racing in the Xfinity Series. Ryan Sieg, son of owner Rod Sieg, was the driver for the 3 races it entered in 2013. He finished 24th at Indy, 21st at Kansas, and withdrew at Atlanta. In 2014, Sieg returned, planning to run the first 5 races, but would run for Truck points. However, after finishing 9th at Daytona, and also running well at other tracks, he declared he was running for rookie of the year and transferring his points to the Xfinity Series. After the 2014 Treatmyclot.com 300, the team was penalized due to the maximum rear body height being too high. Crew chief Kevin Starland and car chief Timothy Brown were placed on probation, the former also being fined $10,000. Sieg ran in the top 20 for most of the races, but did well at Daytona again. Finishing 3rd for his first top 5 finish, and helped push Kasey Kahne to the victory. Sieg finished 16th in points. For 2015, Sieg returned with sponsorship from Uncle Bob's Self Storage. He would run well again, finishing 11th in points and picking up an 8th place finish at Kansas. Sieg returns in 2016, picking up another 3rd place finish at Daytona in July. The team would make the Xfinity chase but was out after Round 1. Sieg’s performance dropped slightly in 2017, missing the chase and finishing 15th in the standings, but got a career-best second-place finish at the June Iowa race to William Byron. Stephen Leicht drove the finale race at Homestead, for Sieg to drive the No. 93 for owner points. The team started 2018 with J. J. Yeley finishing 18th at Daytona. Ryan Sieg took over at Atlanta Motor Speedway and drove the car up until Texas Motor Speedway. In those 5 races he had 2 Top 20’s and 0 DNF’s, his best finish being an 18th at Texas Motor Speedway. J. J. Yeley start and park the 93 ride at Bristol. Ryan Sieg once again took over for the next 25 races, posting 9 top 20’s and a best finish of 6th at Talladega. He also performed well at Kansas, finishing 9th. For the season finale at Homestead-Miami Angela Ruch drove the 93. She start and parked, resulting in a 37th-place finish. For 2019, Ryan Sieg drove every single race in the 93 except for New Hampshire Motor Speedway, where C. J. McLaughlin drove. Sieg posted 25 top-20 finishes, 11 top-10 finishes, and 1 top-5 finish, a 4th at the Daytona 500. McLaughlin finished 28th in his attempt. Before 2020, it was announced Sieg would drive the 39 full-time with CMR Construction & Roofing as his primary sponsor. Sieg nabbed 7 top-5 finishes, 11 top-10 finishes, and 4 DNF’s. He made the chase and made the round of 8, but was unable to make it to the championship 4, and ended out the season 10th in points. Sieg & CMR will return in 2021.

Sieg got off to a rough start in 2021, having 3 DNF’s in his first 5 races. His only top 20 was an 8th-place finish at Homestead-Miami Speedway. Following the Indianapolis race on August 14, crew chief Shane Wilson was suspended for four races after the car lost its left rear tire and caused a caution during the race. RSS Racing decided to release Wilson instead of appealing his penalty. Kyle Sieg, the younger brother of Ryan, would be in the #39 for the Championship race at Phoenix while Ryan would be in the #38.

Sieg returned in 2022 with CMR Construction & Roofing sponsorship.

Car No. 39 results

Car No. 93 history

In 2016, a second, part-time team was announced. Scott Lagasse Jr. was the driver at Daytona, finishing in 29th place. The team skipped Atlanta but was back at Las Vegas with Josh Reaume driving. He ran 13 laps, called it a day, and finished in 38th place. At Phoenix, Dylan Lupton drove, finishing 19th. This team later start and park with Josh Reaume and Josh Wise driving to save their cars for the next race. On June 23, 2016, Starr joined the team to drive the remainder of the season, with sponsorship Massimo Motors, and the team did not start and park. In 2017, the No. 93 team returned as a start and park car with Jordan Anderson, Stephen Leicht, Jeff Green, and Gray Gaulding. Sieg drove this car at Homestead, to be able to secure top 33 owners' points. Sieg returned to the car in 2018 with a 21st place finish at Daytona. J. J. Yeley took over the car, blowing an engine at Atlanta, and start and parking Las Vegas. Jeff Green then became the driver starting with Phoenix, starting and parking the car.

In 2020, rookie Myatt Snider contested much of the schedule in the No. 93. In June, Reaume's Reaume Brothers Racing took over the No. 93's operations for the rest of the season. Snider posted 2 Top 5’s, 6 Top 10’s, 8 DNF’s and a finish of 16th in points for the team.

In 2021, the 93 was renumbered to 23  and eventually ran under the Our Motorsports banner.

Car No. 93 Results

Camping World Truck Series

Truck No. 27 history
Dennis Setzer drove this truck at Homestead in 2011 on occasion when the 93 or 38 were occupied by someone else, but he failed to qualify.

Truck No. 37 history
Dennis Setzer drove this truck at Kentucky in 2012 on occasion when the 38 or the 93 was occupied by another driver, finishing 35th after vibration issues.

Truck No. 38 history
In 2011, Mike Garvey ran this truck as a start and park entry, as Dennis Setzer drove this truck on occasion. Chris Jones and Dennis Setzer ran the truck in 2012, with the best finish of 33rd-place. B.J. McLeod and Johnny Chapman attempted races at Martinsville and Kentucky respectively, failing to qualify. In 2013, J. J. Yeley, Johnny Chapman, Chris Jones, Tony Raines, Scott Riggs and Chad Frewaldt drove the truck as a start and park, with the best finish of 29th-place both at Michigan and Phoenix. In 2020, the no. 38 team was fielded by Front Row Motorsports with Todd Gilliland driving

Truck No. 38 Results

Truck No. 39 history
In 2009, the No. 39 team made its debut at Milwaukee with Sieg driving.
In 2013, Sieg, Ryan Lynch, Austin Dillon, and Alex Guenette ran with the team. Lynch ran at Kentucky, Dillon at Eldora, and Guenette at Mosport. The team ran a limited schedule in 2014. The No. 39 team returned in 2015 at Atlanta, with Sieg driving, and finished 11th.

Truck No. 39 Results

Truck No. 93 history
The team occasionally field start and park operations to fund the No. 39 such as the No. 93 Ryan Sieg, Jason White, Kenny Habul, and Chris Jones ran the No. 93 on a part-time basis in 2013, White also running in 2014.

Truck No. 93 Results

References

External links

NASCAR teams
2009 establishments in Georgia (U.S. state)